Peter Edwards Carmichael Jr. (born October 6, 1971) is an American football coach who is the offensive coordinator for the New Orleans Saints of the National Football League (NFL). He was named offensive coordinator on January 12, 2009, replacing Doug Marrone, who left to become the head coach of the Syracuse Orange. New Orleans led the league in scoring in 2008 and 2009.

Coaching

College
Carmichael began his coaching career as the assistant offensive line coach at the University of New Hampshire in 1994, with the Wildcats winning the Yankee Conference championship. Followed by being the quarterbacks coach at Louisiana Tech from 1995–1999.

Early NFL years
Carmichael's first NFL job was in  when he was the tight ends coach for the Cleveland Browns. The following year Carmichael became the quality control coach for the Washington Redskins.

New Orleans Saints
Carmichael has worked closely with Drew Brees since both arrived in New Orleans from San Diego in  when he became the team's quarterbacks coach. In , Carmichael added on the title of pass game coordinator. He was named offensive coordinator on January 12, 2009, replacing Doug Marrone, who left to become the head coach of the Syracuse Orange.

Throughout his time with the Saints, he has been an important figure in the planning and preparation of the team's offensive attack that ranked first in the league in yardage in his first six seasons and in the top nine every year during his tenure as offensive coordinator. During this period, the club's streak of finishing in the top 10 in offense is the third-longest since the AFL–NFL merger in 1970.

Personal life
Carmichael grew up in Medway, Massachusetts playing for the Mustangs and attended Boston College.
Growing up in a football family, his late father, Pete Carmichael Sr., was a football coach with more than 40 years of coaching experience at the high school, college and NFL levels, including 18 years at Boston College and nine years with the Jacksonville Jaguars.

References

1971 births
Living people
Boston College Eagles baseball players
Cleveland Browns coaches
Louisiana Tech Bulldogs football coaches
National Football League offensive coordinators
New Hampshire Wildcats football coaches
New Orleans Saints coaches
People from Framingham, Massachusetts
People from Medway, Massachusetts
San Diego Chargers coaches
Washington Redskins coaches